Audley and Bignall End railway station was a station on the North Staffordshire Railway, which operated in the West Midlands county of Staffordshire, in England.

History
The station was opened by the North Staffordshire Railway, then joined the London Midland and Scottish Railway during the Grouping of 1923. That company then closed it eight years later.

The site today

References

Further reading

External links
 Station on navigable O.S. map

Railway stations in Great Britain opened in 1880
Railway stations in Great Britain closed in 1931
Disused railway stations in Staffordshire
Former North Staffordshire Railway stations